BGO Records (Beat Goes On) is a British record label specializing in classic rock, blues, jazz, and folk music.

In 1965, Andy Gray opened Andys Records and set up a market stall in Bury St Edmunds, Suffolk. Year by year he opened up more shops. In 1987, he started the BGO label, together with Mike Gott. Gott left the label in 2004 to set up his own label, Gott Discs. However Gott returned to BGO in late 2008.

See also
 List of record labels

References

External links

British record labels
British jazz record labels
Reissue record labels
Record labels established in 1987
Rock record labels
Blues record labels
Jazz record labels
Folk record labels